Joe Pass (born Joseph Anthony Jacobi Passalaqua; January 13, 1929 – May 23, 1994) was an American jazz guitarist. Pass is well known for his work stemming from numerous collaborations with pianist Oscar Peterson and vocalist Ella Fitzgerald, and is often esteemed as one of the most notable jazz guitarists of the 20th century.

Early life 
Pass was born in New Brunswick, New Jersey, on January 13, 1929. His father, Mariano Passalaqua, was a steel mill worker who was born in Sicily. The family later moved to Johnstown, Pennsylvania. Pass became interested in the guitar after he saw Gene Autry in the Western film "Ride, Tenderfoot, Ride. He got his first guitar when he was nine. He took guitar lessons every Sunday with a local teacher for 6-8 months and also practiced for many hours each day.

Pass found work as a performer as early as age 14. He played with bands led by Tony Pastor and Charlie Barnet, honing his guitar skills while learning the ropes in the music industry. He began traveling with small jazz groups and moved from Pennsylvania to New York City. Within a few years, Pass developed an addiction to heroin. He moved to New Orleans for a year and played bebop at strip clubs. Pass revealed to Robert Palmer of Rolling Stone that he had suffered a "nervous breakdown" in New Orleans "because [he] had access to every kind of drug there and was up for days [...] [he] would come to New York a lot, then get strung out and leave." 

Pass spent much of the 1950s in and out of prison for drug-related convictions. In the same Rolling Stone interview, Pass said, "staying high was my first priority; playing was second; girls were third. But the first thing really took all my energy." He recovered after a two-and-a-half-year stay in the Synanon rehabilitation program. Pass largely put music on hiatus during his prison sentence.

Discovery and career 

Pass recorded a series of albums during the 1960s for Pacific Jazz Records, including Catch Me, 12-String Guitar, For Django, and Simplicity. In 1963, he received DownBeat magazine's New Star Award. 
He also played on Pacific Jazz recordings by Gerald Wilson, Bud Shank, and Les McCann. He toured with George Shearing in 1965. During the 1960s, he did mostly TV and recording session work in Los Angeles. Norman Granz, the producer of Jazz at the Philharmonic and the founder of Verve Records, signed Pass to Pablo Records in December 1973. In 1974, Pass released his solo album Virtuoso on Pablo. Also in 1974, Pablo released the album The Trio with Pass, Oscar Peterson, and Niels-Henning Ørsted Pedersen. He performed with them on many occasions throughout the 1970s and 1980s. At the Grammy Awards of 1975, The Trio won the Grammy Award for Best Jazz Performance by a Group. As part of the Pablo roster, Pass recorded with Benny Carter, Milt Jackson, Herb Ellis, Zoot Sims, Duke Ellington, Dizzy Gillespie, Ella Fitzgerald, and Count Basie.

Pass and Ella Fitzgerald recorded six albums together on Pablo toward the end of Fitzgerald's career: Take Love Easy (1973), Fitzgerald and Pass... Again (1976), Hamburg Duets - 1976 (1976), Sophisticated Lady (1975, 1983), Speak Love (1983), and Easy Living (1986).

Later life and death 
Pass was diagnosed with liver cancer in  1992. Although he was initially responsive to treatment and continued to play into 1993, his health eventually declined, forcing him to cancel his tour with Pepe Romero, Paco Peña, and Leo Kottke. Pass performed for the final time on May 7, 1994, with fellow guitarist John Pisano at a nightclub in Los Angeles. Pisano told Guitar Player that after the performance Pass said "I can't play anymore", an exchange that Pisano described as "like a knife in my heart." Joe Pass died from liver cancer in Los Angeles sixteen days later at the age of 65. Prior to his death, he recorded an album of Hank Williams songs with country guitarist Roy Clark.

Speaking about Nuages: Live at Yoshi's, Volume 2, Jim Ferguson wrote:
The follow up to 1993's Joe Pass & Co. Live at Yoshi's, this release was colored by sad circumstances: both bassist Monty Budwig and Pass were stricken with fatal illnesses. Nevertheless, all concerned, including drummer Colin Bailey and second guitarist John Pisano, play up to their usual high levels...Issued posthumously, this material is hardly sub-standard. Bristling with energy throughout, it helps document the final stages in the career of a player who, arguably, was the greatest mainstream guitarist since Wes Montgomery.

Legacy 

New York magazine wrote about Pass, "Joe Pass looks like somebody's uncle and plays guitar like nobody's business. He's called 'the world's greatest' and often compared to Paganini for his virtuosity. There is a certain purity to his sound that makes him stand out easily from other first-rate jazz guitarists."

Discography

Bibliography 
 Mel Bay Presents Joe Pass "Off the Record." Mel Bay, 1993. 
 Complete Joe Pass. Mel Bay, 2003. 
 Miyakaku, Takao. Joe Pass. Tokyo: Seiunsha, 2000.  (photograph collection)

References

External links 
 Joe Pass Jazz Guitar Licks
 Joe Pass Memorial Hall
 Joe Pass Unedited article by Jim Ferguson
 
 

20th-century American guitarists
Bebop guitarists
People from New Brunswick, New Jersey
American jazz guitarists
People from Johnstown, Pennsylvania
Guitarists from Pennsylvania
1929 births
1994 deaths
Grammy Award winners
American people of Italian descent
Deaths from cancer in California
Deaths from liver cancer
American jazz musicians
ACT Music artists
Guitarists from New Jersey
American male guitarists
Jazz musicians from Pennsylvania
20th-century American male musicians
American male jazz musicians